Sangameshwar Gurav was a singer associated with the Kirana Gharana movement.  He was taught musical skills by Ganpatrao Gurav.

Career
Gurav was born in Jamkhandi where his father, Ganpatrao Gurav, was a court musician. Ganpatrao was a direct descendant of Abdul Karim Khan. He was raised by father in Dharwad. He was a teacher in the music department of Karnatak University where he worked alongside Mallikarjun Mansur, Basavraj Rajguru, and Gangubai Hangal.

Awards
Gurav received the Central Sangeet Natak Akademi award for Hindustani vocal music in 2001.

Death and descendants
Gurav died on 7 May 2014 at the age of 86. He is survived by wife, two sons, and two daughters. His son Kaivalya Kumar Gurav continues the musical lineage. His other son Nandikeshwar is a tabla artist employed at Karnatak University.

See also
 Kirana gharana
 Bhimsen Joshi

References

21st-century Indian male classical singers
Hindustani singers
People from Dharwad
Kirana gharana
Singers from Karnataka
2014 deaths
20th-century Indian male classical singers
Recipients of the Sangeet Natak Akademi Award